Muriel Draper (c. 1886 – August 26, 1952) was an American writer, artist and social activist.

Biography
Moving in English and American art circles, she participated in the Harlem Renaissance. A follower of Russian mystic G. I. Gurdjieff, she collaborated with other followers, including poet Jean Toomer. In 1929 she published her major work Music at Midnight, for which she became widely known.

After a trip to the Soviet Union in 1934, she became more engaged in progressive politics.She also visited Spain during the Civil War and later raised funds for the loyalists in New York. From 1937-1938, she hosted the radio program, "It's a Woman's World," where she discussed world politics and art, including the musical, "The Cradle Will Rock" by Marc Blitzstein. She was an activist for peace, US-Soviet friendship, women's rights, civil rights, and civil liberties.

In 1949, she was investigated by the House Un-American Activities Committee but defiantly continued her activism, giving speeches at a meeting of the Women's International Democratic Federation in Moscow and a Women's Conference for Peace in New York later that year. Her papers are stored at Yale University. She was a member of the Women's International Democratic Federation, and its American affiliate the Congress of American Women of which she was president in 1949. She was a founding member of the National Council of American-Soviet Friendship, Chair of the Women's Committee, and later its Executive Secretary. Her son, choreographer Paul Draper, was blacklisted for a time due to his mother's affiliations. Muriel's other son, Raimund Sanders Draper, died as a member of the Royal Air Force in World War II.

References

Bibliography

Sources
 Muriel Draper Papers, Beinecke Rare Book and Manuscript Library, Yale University.

External links
Articles by Muriel Draper at Harper's Magazine
Muriel Draper Papers. Yale Collection of American Literature, Beinecke Rare Book and Manuscript Library.

1880s births
1952 deaths
20th-century American writers
American social activists
Year of birth uncertain
20th-century American women writers